William Knox (20 November 1903 — 11 June 1954) was a Scottish first-class cricketer.

Knox was born at Paisley in November 1903. A club cricketer for Kelburne, he made a single appearance in first-class cricket for Scotland against Yorkshire at Harrogate in 1938. Batting twice in the match as a middle order batsman, he was dismissed without scoring by Ellis Robinson in Scotland's first innings, while in their second innings he was dismissed for the same score by Frank Smailes. Knox died at Paisley in June 1954.

References

External links
 

1903 births
1954 deaths
Sportspeople from Paisley, Renfrewshire
Scottish cricketers